Frederick W. Thiele Jr. (born August 8, 1953) is an American politician who serves in the New York State Assembly from the 1st district since 2013 and the 2nd district from 1992 to 2012, as a member of multiple political parties. Thiele was originally elected as a member of the Republican Party, but switched to the Independence Party of New York in 2009. He joined the Democratic Party after the Independence Party lost its ballot position.

Political career

Thiele began his political career as counsel to former Assemblyman John L. Behan, a position in which he served until 1982. Subsequent to his service as a legislative assistant he became Southampton Town Attorney and East Hampton Town Planning Board Attorney, from 1982 to 1987 and 1982 to 1986 respectively.

In 1987, Thiele won a bid to represent the 16th District within the Suffolk County Legislature, a position he would hold for the subsequent four years. After serving in the Suffolk County Legislature he would go on to be elected as Southampton town supervisor, where he would serve until winning a 1995 special election to succeed his former boss in the State Assembly.

Although elected as a Republican, after being elected to the Suffolk County Legislature, he joined the chamber's nine Democrats to elect a Democrat as presiding officer.

New York Assembly
In 1995, Republican Governor George Pataki appointed Assemblyman John L. Behan as New York State Commissioner of Veterans' Affairs. Behan resigned from the New York Assembly, leaving a vacant seat in the 2nd District. Thiele ran for the seat and defeated Democratic nominee Leo Davis 69%–28% in the March 1995 special election.

He won re-election to his first full term with 62% of the vote. Between 1998 and 2006, he never won re-election with less than 59% of the vote.  In 2008, he defeated Democratic nominee Michael Pitcher 62%–38%.  He won re-election for the first time as a member of the Independence Party, defeating Republican nominee Richard A. Blumenthal 59%–41%.

Thiele announced on October 1, 2009, that he was joining the Independence Party, saying the Republicans no longer stood for "pocketbook issues" and was given permission to caucus with the Democratic supermajority along with the other Independence Party assemblyman, Timothy P. Gordon Thiele, the only Independent in the Assembly, supports an open primary in New York State and supported Bernie Sanders in the 2016 Democratic Primary. Before his switch, Thiele had been ranking minority member on the Assembly Education Committee and vice chairman of the Assembly Minority Joint Conference Committee.

Thiele was a member of the Democratic Party during his time in college. In 2022, left the Independence Party after its lost its automatic ballot line and joined the Democratic Party.

He currently sits on the House Committee on Education, House Committee on Election Law, House Committee on Environmental Conservation, House Committee on Oversight, House Committee on Transportation, and House Committee on Ways and Means.

Personal life

Thiele is a native of Sag Harbor, New York, and graduated from Pierson Middle-High School in 1971. He graduated from Southampton College of Long Island University in 1976 with a B.A. summa cum laude in political science and history. Thiele received a Juris Doctor degree from Albany Law School in 1979 and was admitted to the bar in New York in 1980.

Thiele resides in Sag Harbor. He has a daughter  and two sons.

Electoral history

References

External links
New York State Assembly, 1st District: Fred W. Thiele Jr.

1953 births
Living people
Albany Law School alumni
Independence Party of New York politicians
Democratic Party members of the New York State Assembly
Southampton College alumni
New York (state) lawyers
People from Sag Harbor, New York
21st-century American politicians
Republican Party members of the New York State Assembly